The Madeira Brewery is a brewery in Madeira. The main brand is Coral Lager. The company is the biggest producer and drink distributor in the Autonomous Region of Madeira. It produces alcoholic and non-alcoholic beverages. Until 2007, ECM drinks had been awarded 117 Monde Selection awards. However, Monde Selection awards are non-competitive and only products that pay to enter are judged.

Brands

Coral & Zarco

Coral was first introduced in 1969 and is distributed in Madeira and the Portuguese mainland; it is exported to the UK, Australia and Angola.

''Coral BrancaLager (5.3% Vol) introduced in 1969 
Coral Tónica Stout (5.1% Vol) introduced in 1969 
Coral Sem Álcool Branca Non-alcoholic Lager (0.5% Vol) introduced in 2003
Coral Sem Álcool Tónica'''Non-alcoholic Stout (0.5% Vol) introduced in 2003ZarcoLager (4.5% Vol)

Brisa 

Brisa Água Tónica 
Brisa Ananás
Brisa Cola
Brisa Cola Light
Brisa Cola Zero
Brisa Laranja
Brisa Limonada
Brisa Maçã
Brisa Maracujá
Brisa Manga Mix
Soda Water
BriSol Laranja
BriSol Maracujá
BriSol Trópico
BriSol Maçã
Brisol Manga Zero
BriTea Limão
BriTea Pêssego
BriTea Maracujá

Others

Laranjada
Atlântida sem gás
Atlântida com gás
Atlântida limão

History
1872 - “H.P Miles & Cia" is created to produce Beer and soft drinks in Madeira
1922 - “Araújo, Tavares e Passos" is created for the same purpose
1934 - “H.P Miles & Cia” and “Araújo, Tavares e Passos” merge into 1 company called Empresa de Cervejas da Madeira
1999 - The Pestana Group in partnership with the Miles family, founders of the beer industry in Madeira, purchased the shares of Central de Cervejas in E.C.M. gaining absolute control of the company with a 68% controlling interest.

References

External links
Empresa de Cervejas da Madeira - Brewery of Madeira website (in Portuguese)
www.ratebeer.com - Empresa de Cervejas da Madeira
www.cervejacoral.com (in Portuguese)
www.brisanet.pt (in Portuguese)

Drink companies of Portugal
Beer in Portugal
Drinks from Madeira